Mayan-e Olya (also Romanized as Māyān-e ‘Olyā and Maiané Olya; also known as Kichik Mayān, Māyān Bālā, Māyān-e Bālā, Māyan-e Colyā, Yukari Mayan, and Yūkhārī Māyān) is a village in Aji Chay Rural District, in the Central District of Tabriz County, East Azerbaijan Province, Iran. At the 2006 census, its population was 2,244, in 486 families.

References 

Populated places in Tabriz County